The 1938 Iowa State Cyclones football team represented Iowa State College of Agricultural and Mechanic Arts (later renamed Iowa State University) in the Big Six Conference during the 1938 college football season. In their second season under head coach James J. Yeager, the Cyclones compiled a 7–1–1 record (3–1–1 against conference opponents), finished in second place in the conference, and outscored their opponents by a combined total of 125 to 64. They played their home games at Clyde Williams Field in Ames, Iowa.

Guard Ed Bock and back Everett Kischer were the team captains. Four Iowa State players were selected as first-team all-conference players: Bock, Kischer, end Charles Heileman, and tackle Clyde Shugart.

Schedule

References

Iowa State
Iowa State Cyclones football seasons
Iowa State Cyclones football